The following is a list of Transylvanian personalities.

 Endre Ady, Hungarian poet
 János Apáczai Csere, Hungarian writer and educator
 János Arany, Hungarian poet
 Arthur Arz von Straussenburg, Saxon soldier, last military leader of the Austro-Hungarian Army
 Victor Babeş, Romanian biologist
Ilinca Băcilă, Romanian singer/yodeller. Representative of Romania at the Eurovision Song Contest 2017, alongside Alex Florea.
 Bálint Bakfark, Hungarian composer and lutenist of the Renaissance
 George Bariț, Romanian historian and publicist
 Miklós Bánffy, Hungarian nobleman, politician, and novelist.
 Albert-László Barabási, Hungarian physicist
 Béla Bartók, Hungarian composer
 Elek Benedek, Hungarian journalist and writer
 Gábor Bethlen, prince of Transylvania
 István Bethlen, was a Hungarian aristocrat, statesman, Prime Minister from 1921 to 1931.
 István Bocskai, Hungarian noble from Transylvania, prince of Transylvania
 Simion Bărnuțiu, Romanian philosopher and politician
 István Báthory, Hungarian governor
 Lucian Blaga, Romanian poet, playwright, and philosopher
 Oana Ban, Romanian Olympic gold medal gymnast
 Farkas Bolyai, Hungarian mathematician
 János Bolyai, Hungarian mathematician
 Alexandru Borza, Romanian botanist
 László Bölöni, Romanian ethnic Hungarian football manager
 Sándor Bölöni Farkas, Hungarian writer
 Stephen Bocskay, Hungarian governor
 Sámuel Brassai, Hungarian teacher, musician and artist
 Miklós Bródy, Hungarian chess master
 Samuel von Brukenthal, Saxon administrator
 Johannes Caioni, Franciscan friar, the first ethnic Romanian composer
 Badea Cârțan, Romanian explorer
 Emil Cioran, Romanian essayist and philosopher
 Victor Ciorbea, Romanian jurist, Romanian Ombudsman, ex-Prime Minister of Romania
Octavian Codru Tăslăuanu, Romanian writer and soldier (first in the Austro-Hungarian Army and then in the Romanian Army)
 Matthias Corvinus, Hungarian king
 Andrei Codrescu, Romanian-American writer
 Corneliu Coposu, Romanian politician
 George Coșbuc, Romanian poet
Aron Cotruș, Romanian poet and politician
Miron Cristea, Romanian Prime Minister and Patriarch of All Romania
 Ferenc Dávid, Nontrinitarian and Unitarian preacher, the founder of the Unitarian Church of Transylvania
 Nicolae Densuşianu, Romanian historian and ethnologist
 György Dózsa, Székely revolutionary
 Dumitru Fărcaș, Romanian tárogató (taragot) player
 Carl Filtsch, German pianist
 Gheorghe Funar, Romanian politician
 Áron Gábor, Hungarian revolutionary
 Octavian Goga, Romanian poet and politician
 Petru Groza, Romanian politician
 Johannes Honter, Renaissance humanist and Reformer
 Iuliu Hossu, Romanian bishop, cardinal
 John Hunyadi, voivode of Transylvania and Regent of Hungary
 Avram Iancu, Romanian revolutionary
 Ștefan Octavian Iosif, Romanian poet
 Gabriela Irimia, Romanian pop singer, popular in Britain, see Cheeky Girls
 Monica Irimia, Romanian pop singer, popular in Britain, see Cheeky Girls
 Sándor Kányádi, poet and translator
 Béla and Marta Károlyi, Romanian-American gymnastics coaches
 Zsigmond Kemény, Hungarian author
 Elek Köblös, Romanian ethnic Hungarian politician
 Sándor Kőrösi Csoma, Hungarian explorer and researcher
 Béla Kun, Hungarian Communist politician
 György Kurtág, Hungarian composer
 Károly Kós, Hungarian architect, writer and politician
 Ferenc Kölcsey, Hungarian poet and author of the Hungarian national anthem
 Gheorghe Lazăr, Romanian teacher
 György Ligeti, Hungarian composer
 Vasile Luca, Romanian ethnic Hungarian politician
 Béla Lugosi, Hungarian actor
 George Lusztig, American mathematician
 Iuliu Maniu, Romanian politician and Prime minister of Romania
 Béla Markó, Romanian ethnic Hungarian politician
 Áron Márton, Roman Catholic bishop, anticommunist dissident
 Kelemen Mikes, Hungarian writer
 Gabriela and Mihaela Modorcea, twins sisters comprising the duo Indiggo
Traian Moșoiu, Romanian general and politician
Ion Moța, Romanian politician and volunteer soldier, deputy leader of the Iron Guard killed during the Spanish Civil War
 Gheorghe Mureșan, Romanian basketball player
 Andrei Mureșanu, Romanian poet and revolutionary
 Franz Nopcsa, Austrian-Hungarian paleontologist
 József Nyírő, Hungarian writer
 Hermann Oberth, Saxon inventor and physicist
 Nicolaus Olahus, Romanian ethnic writer, Roman Catholic Archbishop of Hungary
 Balázs Orbán, Hungarian writer, historian and politician
 Octavian Paler, Romanian essayist
 Gabriel Pascal, Hungarian film producer
 Péter Pázmány, Hungarian theologian and writer
 Florin Piersic, Romanian actor
 Gheorghe Pop de Băsești, Romanian politician
 Aurel Popovici, Romanian federalist
 Dumitru Prunariu, Romanian cosmonaut
Sextil Pușcariu, Romanian linguist and philologist
 László Rajk, Hungarian politician
 Ion Rațiu, Romanian politician
Emil Rebreanu, ethnic-Romanian Austro-Hungarian Army officer
 Liviu Rebreanu, Romanian novelist
 Stephan Ludwig Roth, Saxon pedagogue and Lutheran pastor
 Ioan Slavici, Romanian writer
 András Sütő, Hungarian writer
Horia Sima, leader of the Iron Guard and co-leader of the National Legionary State
 Gheorghe Șincai, Romanian historian and pedagogue
Ilie Șteflea, Romanian Army Corps General and Chief of the Romanian General Staff for most of Romania's involvement in World War II
 Alexandru Sterca-Șuluțiu, Romanian bishop
 Ioan Sterca-Șuluțiu, 1848 Romanian revolutionary
 Ioan Suciu, Romanian bishop
 Vasile Suciu, Romanian bishop
 Gabriela Szabo, Romanian athlete
 István Szamosközy, Hungarian humanist and historian
 Áron Tamási, Hungarian writer
 Sámuel Teleki, Hungarian Chancellor of Transylvania, founder of the Teleki Library
 Sámuel Teleki, Austrian-Hungarian explorer
 Alexandru Todea, Romanian bishop, cardinal
 László Tőkés, Hungarian bishop
 Alexandru Vaida-Voevod, Romanian politician
 Francisc Vaștag, first Romanian to win the supreme belt in his category
 Sándor Veress, Hungarian composer
 Vlad III Dracula, Transylvanian-born Wallachian (Romanian) prince
 Aurel Vlaicu, Romanian aviation pioneer
 Traian Vuia, Romanian inventor and aviation pioneer
 Albert Wass, Hungarian writer
 Johnny Weissmuller, Swabian actor
 István Werbőczy, jurist and statesman
 Miklós Wesselényi, Hungarian politician and writer
 Elie Wiesel, Jewish author and Holocaust survivor

Transylvanians

Transylvanians